Strange Place for Snow is a studio album by the Swedish group Esbjörn Svensson Trio released in 2002.

Background
The album was recorded in December 2001 and released in Europe on March 1, 2002 by ACT Music. The international release was on June 4, 2002 by Sony BMG.

Reception
The recording was awarded the annual prize of the German Record Critics 2002 and the German Jazz Award.

Track listing
 "The Message" – 	5:16
 "Serenade For The Renegade" – 	4:30
 "Strange Place For Snow" – 	6:44
 "Behind The Yashmak" – 	10:30
 "Bound For The Beauty Of The South" – 	5:10
 "Years Of Yearning" – 	5:44
 "When God Created The Coffeebreak" – 	6:38
 "Spunky Sprawl" – 	6:29
 "Carcrash" – 	18:01	

The last track of the CD release – "Carcrash" – contains a hidden track. The tracks itself ends at 05:05 and after about three minutes of silence the hidden track commences.

Personnel

Daniel Berglund 	– Double Bass
Magnus Öström 	– Percussion, Drums
Esbjörn Svensson 	– Keyboards, Piano (Grand)

Production

E.S.T. 	– Producer
Janne Hansson 	– Engineer, Mixing
Åke Linton 	– Engineer
Tommy Lydell 	– Mastering

References

2002 albums
Esbjörn Svensson Trio albums
ACT Music albums